Marovo Island is an island in the Solomon Islands. It is located in the Western Province. Marovo was the island where Australian sailor and author John Cromar mostly operated in his later years.

See also

References

Islands of the Solomon Islands
Western Province (Solomon Islands)